Baka (in hiragana, or  in katakana) means "fool", or (as an adjectival noun) "foolish" and is the most frequently used pejorative term in the Japanese language. This word baka has a long history, an uncertain etymology (possibly from Sanskrit or Classical Chinese), and linguistic complexities.

Word

History
The first written usages of baka were during the Nanboku-chō period (1336–1392), when the "Northern and Southern Courts" battled.

In the earliest example, the Taiheiki historical epic records bakamono being used as an insult in 1342. The Ashikaga commander Toki Yoritō refuses to pay obeisance to retired Emperor Kōgon ( 1313–1364), "Yoritō, probably inebriated, loudly demands to know what kind of fool (bakamono) has the temerity to order him to dismount." According to Carr, "Shinmura [Izuru] found that the original editions (fourteenth century) of the Taiheiki had baka written ; [while] later movable-type editions (c. 1600) had the characters ."

A Bunmei-era (1469–1487) edition of the Setsuyōshū dictionary notes baka , which was also written  (lit. "mother bride"),  (lit. "break family"), means rōzeki  "disorder; confusion".

Many classical Japanese texts used baka. Ihara Saikaku's (1682) Kōshoku Ichidai Otoko ("The Life of an Amorous Man"), which was a classic of the Ukiyozōshi genre, wrote baka with the modern kanji .

Etymologies
Although the origins of baka are uncertain, Japanese scholars have proposed various etymologies and folk etymologies. The two most widely cited are a Classical Chinese idiom and a loanword from Sanskrit.
 
First, the oldest hypothesis suggests that baka originated as a Chinese literary "allusion to a historical fool", the Qin Dynasty traitor Zhao Gao ( 207 BCE) from the Records of the Grand Historian. This etymology first appears in the (c. 1548) Unbo Irohashū dictionary, which glosses baka  as meaning "point at a deer and say horse" (指鹿曰馬). Namely, the Chinese idiom zhǐlù-wéimǎ (lit. "point at a deer and call it a horse", Japanese  Shika o Sashite Uma to Nasu) meaning "deliberate misrepresentation for ulterior purposes". Zhao was an infamous minister who served the first emperor Qin Shi Huang (r. 246–221 BCE) and forced the second Qin Er Shi (r. 210–207 BCE) to commit suicide.

Zhao Gao was contemplating treason but was afraid the other officials would not heed his commands, so he decided to test them first. He brought a deer and presented it to the Second Emperor but called it a horse. The Second Emperor laughed and said, "Is the chancellor perhaps mistaken, calling a deer a horse?" Then the emperor questioned those around him. Some remained silent, while some, hoping to ingratiate themselves with Zhao Gao, said it was a horse, and others said it was a deer. Zhao Gao secretly arranged for all those who said it was a deer to be brought before the law. Thereafter the officials were all terrified of Zhao Gao. 

The Japanese idiom first appears in the 11th-century novel The Tale of Genji.

Kokiden flew into a rage. "A man out of favor with His Majesty is expected to have trouble feeding himself. And here he is living in a fine stylish house and saying awful things about all of us. No doubt the grovelers around him are assuring him that a deer is a horse.

Second, the most linguistically sound etymology is that baka derives from a Sanskrit word meaning "fool". According to the Japanese linguist and lexicographer Shinmura Izuru, the Edo-period scholar Amano Sadakage (1663–1733) originally suggested that Japanese Buddhist priests coined the word baka from Sanskrit. Modern reference works give two possible Sanskrit sources for the word, moha  (transcribed 慕何) "foolish" and mahallaka (摩訶羅) "stupid". Sanskrit moha means "bewilderment, loss of consciousness, delusion, folly" and comes from the root muh meaning "bewildered, perplexed, confused". Sanskrit mahallaka means "senile, feeble minded, stupid, decrepit" and comes from mūrkha, meaning "dull, stupid, foolish, inexperienced; fool".

Other proposed etymologies for baka are less reliable. Two Edo-period dictionaries proposed that baka derived from: ōmaka  "generous; unsparing" (Rigen Shūran ) or bokeru  "grow senile; dote; become feeble-minded" (Matsuya Hikki ).

Related words

The same 馬鹿 "horse deer" characters that transcribe baka are also used for names in Chinese zoological nomenclature and Japanese mythology.

In Chinese, mǎlù refers to the red deer (Cervus elaphus),  Japanese akashika .

Mumashika is a rare alternate Japanese reading of  that names a yōkai demon with a horse's head and deer's body. The c. 1832 Hyakki Yagyō Emaki ("Hyakki Yagyō emakimono") depicts it with one eye, a horse's mouth and ears, and deer horn and hooves.

Meanings
Based on semantic analyses of baka entries in Japanese dictionaries and thesauruses, the lexicographer Michael Carr differentiates eight interrelated meanings.

Three basic "fool; foolish" meanings distinguish baka1 "ass; jerk; fool", baka2 "ament; idiot; imbecile; fool" (ament is a rare word for "congenitally mentally deficient"), and baka3 "blockhead; dullard; dimwit; simpleton; dolt; fool". These are found in many frequently-used Japanese expressions. Some more insulting lexemes are bakamono  "stupid,fool,idiot", ōbaka  "big fool damned idiot", and baka-yarō  "stupid jerk, ass, asshole, dumbass". Some compounds are baka yoke  "foolproof; idiot-proof", baka warai  "foolish/horse laugh" and baka zura  "foolish face; stupid look"; and some verb phrases are baka ni suru  "make a fool of (someone); treat with contempt", baka yobawarisuru  "call (someone) a fool", and baka o miru  "make a fool/ass of (oneself)".

Two extended meanings of baka4 "worthless" and baka5 "excess" expand upon "folly; foolishness". Baka4 "worthless; foolish; valueless; trifling; insignificant" is used in expressions such as bakageta  "foolish; absurd; ridiculous"; bakana  "foolish; silly; stupid"; and bakarashii , bakabakarashii , or bakakusai , all meaning "foolish; absurd; ridiculous". It is further used in phrases like baka ie  "Nonsense!; Go on!", and bakana mane o suru  "do a foolish thing; act foolishly". Baka5 "excess; foolish; absurd; extreme; extravagant" is found in a number of expressions: bakani  or bakabakashiku  "awfully; terribly; extremely"; bakayasui  "ridiculously/dirt cheap"; bakane  or bakadakai  "ridiculously expensive"; bakateinei  "excessive politeness"; and bakashōjiki  "honest to a fault".

Three special meanings are unrelated semantic connections. Baka6 "trough shell" is a truncation of bakagai  "trough shell; Mactra chinensis". Baka7 "numbness (of limbs)" is used in the expression baka ni naru , and baka8 means "(an antique kind of) coin counter".

Usages
Baka, which originated as a 14th-century literary insult, has become "the most commonly used" swearword in contemporary Japanese. Usages of this term can be discussed in terms of pragmatic depth, dialectal variation, and proper names.

Pragmatics
The linguistic pragmatics of using insults like baka can be language specific. For instance, Japanese has fewer words for calling someone a "fool" than English. Jack Seward recounts asking his language teacher "to prepare a list of the most stunning and forcible insults, pejoratives, and curses in Japanese", but was surprised that the "short, unimaginative, and seeming ineffectual" list had only two words: baka "fool" and chikushō  "beast".

Carr proposes that intentional vagueness explains the comparatively small lexical field of Japanese insults.
 
One likely reason for the relatively few Japanese words for 'fool' is vagueness. In both English and Japanese, the words for 'fool' have meanings that vary along scales of friendly–hostile, or joking–serious. In English, at one end of a scale are words like silly goose and at the other end are words like stupid asshole. And in Japanese, at one end are words like kamaboko baka  'silly chump' and at the other end are words like baka-yarō  'damn fool'. The difference is in the degree of lexical diversification along the scales of meaning. English seems to have more 'fool' words with more specificity – Japanese seems to have fewer 'fool' words with more vagueness. There are decided pragmatic and communicative advantages to such lexical vagueness. If you call me a stupid son-of-a-bitch, I know exactly what you mean. But if you call me a baka-yarō, I cannot be so sure of what you mean. The expression baka-yarō  is one of the most insulting terms in the Japanese lexicon, but it is vague and can range in meaning from an affectionate 'silly-willy' to an abusive 'jerk-off fool'. Baka-yarō is so widely used that it has become semantically weak and vague. Such vagueness can serve to conceal hostility and thus to maintain social harmony.

Dialectal
Japanese dialects show regional variations between using baka in Kantō dialect and aho  or  "fool; idiot; jackass" in Kansai dialect. In addition, the insult aho has more of a slang connotation than baka. Many Japanese dictionaries treat the words baka and aho as synonyms. "However, in Osaka and its surroundings, aho is a rather non-offensive word, whereas baka is an explosive word." Nevertheless, "In Tokyo and its surroundings, we find exactly the opposite, so you must be careful with the usage of these words."

Proper names
Baka frequently occurs in proper nouns. Examples from Japanese pop music include albums (Pretty Little Baka Guy, Ai no Baka "Love Fool") and songs ("Suki Sugite Baka Mitai" "To Like [Him] Too Much and Look Like a Fool"). Some titles from modern Japanese literature are Tsuribaka Nisshi ("Fishing Fool's Diary"), Inubaka: Crazy for Dogs ("Dog Fool"), Karate Baka Ichidai ("A Karate-Crazy Life"), and Baka to Test to Shōkanjū ("Idiots, Tests, and Summoned Creatures").

English
During World War II, baka was American military slang for the Imperial Japanese Yokosuka MXY-7 Ohka kamikaze flying bomb. The earliest recorded usage was in Newsweek on May 7, 1945, "American forces have officially designated this bomb as 'baka', baka being Japanese for foolish, silly, or stupid." In modern times, baka has often been used in anime communities. This has also led to the satirical and ironic use of baka to call someone a fool or mock anime communities, especially in Internet meme spaces.

See also
 Japanese profanity

References

External links

ばか【馬鹿, 莫迦, 破家】, jeKai
What Does Baka Mean in Japanese – and Why You (Probably) Shouldn’t Use It, Coto Japanese Academy

Slurs related to low intelligence
Japanese words and phrases